Rudmore is a district located on the western shore of Portsea Island and is part of the city of Portsmouth, England.

The area used to be a residential area, mainly catering for employees of the naval dockyard and their families. It was heavily damaged by bombing during World War II. In the late 1960s and early 1970s much of the area was cleared to make way for the M275 motorway and Portsmouth International Port. The parish church was St John the Baptist,  and is now flats.

Rudmore also lends its name to a major road intersection known as The Rudmore Roundabout, which connects the M275 motorway, the A3 trunk road to London and A2047 Kingston Crescent.

Notes

Areas of Portsmouth